Tom Casswell, better known as TC and also as Tommy Boy, is an English drum and bass producer, singer and DJ. He left school and started making music inspired by the sounds of the Bristol scene and the music and atmosphere of St. Paul's, the area of Bristol where he grew up.

The first two releases from TC "Get It On" and "Make a Little Space" appeared on Bristol based label BS1 Records. His debut album, Evolution, was released in 2007 on D-Style Recordings. TC also presented the latest edition of Watch the Ride, a compilation CD released several times a year. Scratch Perverts and DJ Zinc have released them previously. His tracks "Deep" (featuring MC Jakes) and "Jump" have achieved critical acclaim in the rave scene. TC has made appearances on shows hosted by Radio 1's Zane Lowe and was regarded as a breath of fresh air in the drum and bass scene.

He is featured as a vocalist and an additional producer in "Plastic World", a song on Pendulum's 2005 album Hold Your Colour (which topped 225,000 sales), along with other featured artist Fats. He was also a vocalist for the Sub Focus song "Follow the Light", which was featured in Douwma's self-titled album, Sub Focus. His follow-up Sub Focus collaboration with Culture Shock, "You Make It Better", also features his vocals and was released on Torus. His 2013 single "Get Down Low" was released through Skrillex's record label Owsla and entered the UK Singles Chart at number 183.

In 2014, DJ Fresh reworked Casswell's previously unreleased song "Make You Bounce" and Little Nikki added vocals. The product, "Make U Bounce", was released on 29 June as the third single from Fresh's forthcoming fourth studio album. Following its chart success, Casswell signed to 3Beat for his next single "Everything for a Reason", released on 26 October. His collaboration with Wilkinson, entitled "Hit the Floor", was released in January 2015 through RAM Records.

In January 2016, he played the world's first Dolby Atmos night, at Ministry of Sound.

TC's sophomore album, Unleash the Wolves, was released on 8 July 2016 via 3Beat, and includes the single "Rep" (featuring Jakes). He was also the featured vocalist on Zomboy's single "Saints and Sinners", released on 7 August 2017.

Discography

Albums
 Evolution – D-Style Recordings – 8 October 2007
 Unleash the Wolves - 3Beat - 8 July 2016
 Circles of Fifths - Don't Play Records- 27 October 2017

Singles and EPs
 Resonator / Get It On (12") – BS1 Records – 2002	
 Getcha Some More / Make A Little Space (12") – BS1 Records – 2003	
 Jamaica Street / All on Me (12") – Beatz – 2004	
 Fire in the Hole (Remixes) (12") – D-Style Recordings – 2005	
 Let's Go / New Year (12") – Valve – 2005	
 No Escape / Sick & Twisted (12") – Test Recordings – 2005	
 Deep / Robots (12") – D-Style Recordings – 2006
 Jump / Flatline (12") – D-Style Recordings – 2006
 Rock Star / Game Over (12") – D-Style Recordings – 2007	
 Where's My Money? / Deep (Roni Size VIP) (12") – D-Style Recordings – 2007
 Where's My Money (Clipz Remix) / Drink (Xample Remix) (12") – D-Style Recordings – 2008
 Where's My Money (Caspa Remix) / Tron (12") – D-Style Recordings – 2008
 Borrowed Time VIP / Pornstar (12") D-Style Recordings – 2008
 Concrete / Burning Starlight (12") – Don't Play – 2011
 Tap Ho / Don't Play (12") – Don't Play – 2011
 Bass by the Tonne EP (2×12") – Don't Play – 2012
 No One / Tap Ho (Taxman Remix) (12") – Don't Play – 2012
 Do You Rock? / Drug FuCT (12") – Don't Play – 2012
 Get Down Low (EP) – Owsla – 2013
 Into the Jungle / Deuces – Don't Play – 2014
 Make U Bounce (DJ Fresh vs. TC) – Ministry of Sound – 2014
 Everything for a Reason – 3Beat – 2014
 Hit the Floor (with Wilkinson) - RAM Records - 2015
 The Countdown - Self-released - 2015
 Show Some Love (featuring Little Grace) - 3Beat - 2015
 Rep (featuring Jakes) - 3Beat - 2015
 Saints and Sinners (With. Zomboy) [Never Say Die] — 2017

Remixes

References

External links
 @TCDNB on Twitter
 
 

Living people
English DJs
English record producers
English drum and bass musicians
Musicians from Bristol
Year of birth missing (living people)
Owsla artists
Electronic dance music DJs